Protest is a 1967 Croatian film directed by Fadil Hadžić, starring Bekim Fehmiu and Antun Vrdoljak.

Plot
Ivo Bajsić (Bekim Fehmiu), a construction worker, commits suicide by jumping off a skyscraper in downtown Zagreb. Police investigator Marković (Antun Vrdoljak) tries to find out the motives behind his act by interviewing people who knew him: his wife, friends and coworkers. In flashbacks, Bajsić's history and the events that led to his suicide are gradually revealed. He is depicted as a controversial man: honest and hard-working, but also maladjusted and quick-tempered, even violent. Marković's investigation finds that he was recently fired from his job because he stood up against his company's corrupt director...

Sources
 Protest at hrfilm.hr

Further reading

External links
 

1967 films
1960s Croatian-language films
Films directed by Fadil Hadžić
Films set in Zagreb
Films set in Croatia
Films set in Yugoslavia
Films about suicide
Croatian black-and-white films
Croatian drama films
1967 drama films
Yugoslav drama films